Tajareh Sar Ab-e Sadat (also Romanized as Tajareh Sar Āb-e Sādāt; also known as Tajreh-ye Sarāb) is a village in Dehpir-e Shomali Rural District, in the Central District of Khorramabad County, Lorestan Province, Iran. At the 2006 census, its population was 279, in 63 families.

References 

Towns and villages in Khorramabad County